The New Jersey Register of Historic Places is the official list of historic resources of local, state, and national interest in the U.S. state of New Jersey. The program is administered by the New Jersey's state historic preservation office within the New Jersey Department of Environmental Protection.

The register was established under the terms of the New Jersey Register of Historic Places Act of 1970. The New Jersey Register mirrors the National Register of Historic Places, and uses the same criteria for eligibility.

Current listings not on the National List

Gloucester County
See National Register of Historic Places listings in Gloucester County, New Jersey for the national list. 

Broad Street Historic District encompassing Broad Street (between Woodbury Creek and Courtland Street) and 
Delaware Street (between Broad and Wood streets) was listed (#1429) on February 19, 1988. It includes the Gloucester County Courthouse.

Hunterdon County
See National Register of Historic Places listings in Hunterdon County, New Jersey for the national list. 

|}

Mercer County
See National Register of Historic Places listings in Mercer County, New Jersey for the national list. 

It was petitioned to be de-certified.

It is now known as Station Plaza.

There was a book published in the early 80's.

It is no longer listed on the map.
In included an area including Carroll street,  Southard Street, Yard Avenue, South Clinton Avenue, and East State Street, and was considered to be "Railroad Age".

|}

Somerset County
See National Register of Historic Places listings in Somerset County, New Jersey for the national list. 

|}

See also
New Jersey Historic Trust
New Jersey Historical Society
National Register of Historic Places listings in New Jersey
List of the oldest buildings in New Jersey

References

External links

 
New Jersey Historic Preservation Office - Lists by county

 
Register of Historic Places
New Jersey
Register of Historic Places